Ju (born Tin Tin Win on 20 September 1958) is a Burmese novelist, well known for her strong, intelligent female characters.

Early life and education
Ju was born 20 September 1958 in Yenangyaung. She is the third child of U Thaung and Daw Nyein, having five siblings. She graduated from the high school at Yenangyaung in 1975 and graduating with an MBBS degree from Institute of Medicine, Mandalay in 1983.

Career
Despite her interest in writing, upon her mother's prodding, she pursued medical studies at the Institute of Medicine, Mandalay. She started writing while in medical school University of Medicine, Mandalay and her first short story was published in 1979. Her writing career took off in the late 1980s, with her debut novel, Remembrance, published in 1987. The bestseller novel stirred controversy for endorsing Western existentialist philosophy and portraying cohabitating unwed couples.

She published fifteen novels (most of them were adapted into films), seven collections of short stories and seven collections of articles on the environment. She currently works as a co-founder of an HIV positive children orphanage and also a participant in the HIV/AIDS Media Initiative and Yadana Metta Foundation. Her writings now focus on environmental conservation.

Works

Novels
 1987– AMhatTaya –
 1990– Myit Toe Ei Maryar –
 1991– Kaung Kin Ma Par Thaw Nya and other short novels –
 1991– Kyae Mwa Twar Thaw Tain Tite Myar Akyaung –
 1992– Essential Rain –
 1993– Nanyan Ei Achar Taphat –
 1994– Main Ma Ta Yaut Ei Phwint Ha Win Khan Chat –
 1994– Chit Chin Ei Anupyinnyar and other short novels –
 1995– Kankyamar Ko Ma Yone Kyi Kya Thu Myar –
 1996– Pinlae Nyint Tu Thaw MainMa Myar –
 1996– Myit Ta Sin Ko Phyat Kyaw Chin –
 1997– Kyar Tot Thi Lae Maung Sa Kar –
 1997– My Tree –
 1997– Yar Sa Win Htae Mhar Maung Ko Htar Kae –
 1997– Yae Myaw Thie –
 1998– The Books I read-
 1999– Sayarwon Ta Yaut Ei Mhatsu Myar –
 2000– Chit Thu Yae Tae Kyon Ma Ye Nya Twe-
 2004- Tain Nae Chi Tae Kyoe-
 2006 - Saunt Nay Mal Lo MA Pyaw Lite Buu -
 2008– Thu Min Ko Bal Tot Mha –
 2011– Let The More Loving One Be Me-
 2014- Sone Nay Yat Nae Lwan Lay Chin(ဆုံနေရက်နဲ့လွမ်းနေခြင်း)
 A Thit Sat Sat Htar Wa Ya ( အသစ္စက္စက္ထာ၀ရ)
2018-Rainbow Lover's cover (သက်တန့်တို့ဖြင့် ရစ်ဖွဲ့ ချစ်သူရဲ့ ခြုံလွှာ)

Novella
Kye Taw Nyake Moe Kaw Chin (with Nay Win Myint) –

References

1958 births
Living people
Burmese writers
People from Magway Division
University of Medicine, Mandalay alumni
20th-century Burmese women writers
21st-century Burmese women writers
20th-century Burmese writers
21st-century Burmese writers